Michael Edward Spillane (born 23 March 1989) is a former professional footballer, who played as a defender, currently assistant manager at Chelmsford City. Born in England, he represented the Republic of Ireland at youth international level.

Club career
Spillane signed a full, professional, three-year contract with Norwich City on 30 June 2006. He had already made his first team debut by this time against West Ham United in the 2006 FA Cup third round, making him the youngest ever player for Norwich City to play in the FA Cup.

Spillane was given his first extended run in the Norwich side by manager Peter Grant towards the end of the 2006–07 season. He got his chance in the centre of midfield due to injuries to Youssef Safri, Simon Lappin and Mark Fotheringham. This was after he initially played at right back under Nigel Worthington.

Spillane signed on loan for Luton Town for the 2008–09 season in August 2008. He scored his first Luton goal in the match against Aldershot Town on 13 September. Spillane made a total of 38 league appearances for Luton, scoring three goals. He was also part of the Luton side that won the Football League Trophy, beating Scunthorpe United 3–2 at Wembley.

In April 2009, Spillane signed a two-year contract extension with Norwich City. Spillane went on to play a bigger part in Norwich's 2009–10 League One winning season playing 13 times and scoring once against Leyton Orient, although he missed around half the season with injury. In July 2010, he transferred to Brentford for an undisclosed fee. In September 2010, he scored his penalty as Brentford knocked Everton out of the League Cup on penalties. Spillane scored his first and what turned out to be only Brentford goal in a 3–1 win at Sheffield Wednesday.

He signed on loan for Dagenham & Redbridge, on 17 November 2011, turning this into a permanent deal on 6 January 2012.

On 17 January 2013, Spillane signed for Southend United.

On 23 August 2013, Spillane signed a one-year-deal with Cambridge United. He left the club on 31 January 2014 by mutual consent and joined Sutton United.

On 26 September 2015, Spillane signed for Lowestoft Town, becoming the eighth former Norwich player at the club. In December 2016, Spillane moved a tier higher to join Chelmsford City. On 30 March 2019, Spillane made his 100th appearance in all competitions for Chelmsford, captaining and scoring for the club in a 2–1 home win against Oxford City. On 30 January 2020, Spillane was confirmed as assistant to interim manager Robbie Simpson alongside Chris Whelpdale following the sacking of Rod Stringer. On 28 April 2020, Spillane was named as Chelmsford's Head of Academy.

International career
Spillane has represented Republic of Ireland U17s, for whom he was the captain. Spillane also captained the Republic of Ireland U18s to an international tournament win, scoring twice in the Portugal tournament; netting in a 2–2 draw with Belgium and then striking a late winner against Portugal. The squad also recorded a 3–1 win against Georgia.

He has played six times for Republic of Ireland U21s, scoring the equaliser in a 1–1 draw against Germany in February 2009. Spillane won the Republic of Ireland Under-19 Player of the Year Award in March 2009.

Personal life
Spillane was born in Jersey as a result of his mother being hospitalised on the island for the final eight weeks of her pregnancy. Spillane's uncle, Terry, has previously managed Stansted, Aveley and Maldon & Tiptree.

Career statistics

Honours
Luton Town
Football League Trophy: 2008–09

Norwich City
Football League One: 2009–10

References

External links
 Michael Spillane player profile at canaries.co.uk
 
 Ireland profile at Soccerscene
 

1989 births
Living people
Jersey footballers
Republic of Ireland association footballers
Republic of Ireland under-21 international footballers
Norwich City F.C. players
Luton Town F.C. players
Brentford F.C. players
Dagenham & Redbridge F.C. players
Southend United F.C. players
Cambridge United F.C. players
Sutton United F.C. players
Lowestoft Town F.C. players
English Football League players
National League (English football) players
Association football midfielders
Association football defenders
Chelmsford City F.C. players
Republic of Ireland expatriate association footballers
English footballers
English people of Irish descent
Chelmsford City F.C. non-playing staff
Association football coaches